Jorge Emanuel Morel Barrios (born 22 January 1998) is a Paraguayan footballer who plays as a midfielder for Turkish club Adana Demirspor on loan from Guaraní.

On October 10th 2019 Morel made his debut for the Paraguay national team in a 1-0 loss against Slovakia. On making his debut, Morel said in an interview “Every achievement I get marks something in my life, but debuting in the senior team so far is the best. I am very happy to accomplish this at such a young age.”

Honours
Guarani
Paraguayan Primera División: 2016 Clausura
Copa Paraguay: 2018

References

External links
 
 
 
 
 

1998 births
Sportspeople from Asunción
Living people
Paraguayan footballers
Paraguay youth international footballers
Paraguay international footballers
Association football midfielders
Club Guaraní players
Club Atlético Lanús footballers
Estudiantes de La Plata footballers
Adana Demirspor footballers
Paraguayan Primera División players
Argentine Primera División players
Paraguayan expatriate footballers
Paraguayan expatriate sportspeople in Argentina
Expatriate footballers in Argentina
Paraguayan expatriate sportspeople in Turkey
Expatriate footballers in Turkey